Vittoria Farnese (not to be confused with Vittoria Farnese, Duchess of Urbino) (29 April 1618 – 10 August 1649) was an Italian noblewoman. She was born in Parma, the daughter of Ranuccio I Farnese, Duke of Parma and Margherita Aldobrandini, niece of Pope Clement VIII. On 12 February 1648 she married Francesco I d'Este, widower of her sister Maria Farnese. Vittoria died in Modena in 1649, dying while giving birth to the couple's only child, also called Vittoria (1649–1656).  Francesco then married a third time, to Lucrezia Barberini, in Loreto in October 1654.

Ancestry

References

1618 births
1649 deaths
Vittoria
Vittoria
Nobility from Parma
House of Este
Vittoria
Italian people of German descent
Italian people of Austrian descent
Italian people of Portuguese descent
17th-century Italian nobility
Deaths in childbirth
Daughters of monarchs